Gualaceo Sporting Club is an Ecuadorian professional football club from the city of Gualaceo. Founded on 2 April 2000, they play in the Serie A.

History
Founded on 2 April 2000, the club first reached the Segunda Categoría in 2005 after finishing second in the Segunda Categoría del Azuay, but were knocked out in the first stage. After again reaching only the first stage in 2009, the club reached the final phase of the tournament in 2010, finishing fourth.

Guadalceo won two consecutive regional tournaments in 2011 and 2012, but again failed to achieve promotion in the national division. After only playing in the regional division in 2013, the club again reached the Segunda Categoría in 2014, where they achieved promotion to the Serie B as champions.

After a seventh place finish in their first year in the second division, Gualaceo finished third in 2016, only two points shy of second-placed Clan Juvenil. After another seventh place in 2017, the club finished eleventh in 2018, but did not suffer relegation after the number of teams in the first division increased and the relegation in both first and second divisions were declared void.

After a third and sixth position finish in 2019 and 2020, respectively, Guadalceo achieved a first-ever promotion to the Serie A on 13 October 2021, after a 1–0 home win over Atlético Santo Domingo and El Nacional's draw with Independiente Juniors.

Achievements
Serie B
Runner-up (1): 2021

Segunda Categoría
Winner (1): 2014

Players

Current squad

References

External links
 

Football clubs in Ecuador
Association football clubs established in 2000
2000 establishments in Ecuador